Stephanie Williams is an Australian rules footballer playing for Richmond in the AFL Women's league. Williams was recruited by Geelong with the twenty seventh selection in the 2020 AFL Women's draft. Williams is an Indigenous Australian of Larrakia and Iwaidja descent.

Early football
Williams played for the Darwin Football Club in their under 18s division as a junior, where she was named as best on ground in their premiership victory, and later the Geelong Falcons and Central Allies in the professionally run leagues.

AFLW career
Williams debuted for Geelong in the second round of the 2021 AFL Women's season. On debut, Williams collected 5 disposals and 2 tackles. In May 2022, Williams was traded to Richmond in exchange for Ingrid Houtsma.

Statistics
Statistics are correct to the end of the 2021 season.

|- style="background-color: #eaeaea"
! scope="row" style="text-align:center" | 2021
|style="text-align:center;"|
| 25 || 4 || 0 || 1 || 7 || 5 || 12 || 0 || 5 || 0.0 || 0.5 || 1.8 || 1.3 || 3.0 || 0.0 || 1.3
|- class="sortbottom"
! colspan=3| Career
! 4
! 0
! 1
! 7
! 5
! 12
! 0
! 5
! 0.0
! 0.5
! 1.8
! 1.3
! 3.0
! 0.0
! 1.3
|}

References

2002 births
Living people
Geelong Football Club (AFLW) players
Australian rules footballers from the Northern Territory
Sportswomen from the Northern Territory
Indigenous Australian players of Australian rules football